Curtuiușu may refer to one of several places in Romania:

 Curtuiușu Dejului, a village in Vad Commune, Cluj County
 Curtuiușu Mare, a village in Valea Chioarului Commune, Maramureș County
 Curtuiușu Mic, a village in Copalnic-Mănăștur Commune, Maramureș County
 Curtuiușu River